Soldiershop Publishing is an Italian Zanica-based publishing company specializing in military history. Generally, it bases its production on military history, from the Roman Empire to present history, in most occasions, focusing on the particular History of Italy. The book lengths varies from 60 to 90 pages. The publisher is also known for its illustrated series, which usually share resemblance with Osprey Publishing ones.

History
Soldiershop was formally created in 1983 by Luca S. Cristini, its current publisher. The publisher's name changed during the 1980s from Lucas' Miniatures to Glory Distribution Service, eventually becoming Soldiershop in the early 1990s, as military history modeling publisher. In 2000, it started to publish its own e-books, which were relatively scarce. In the following years, it started to publish paper books divided in several series, such as Soldiers & Weapons, very similar to Osprey Publishing's Men at Arms because of its content and page length. As December 2017, it was the first and only Italian publisher to accept bitcoins as payment method.

References

Book publishing companies of Italy
Mass media in Italy
Publishing companies established in 1983